Peter Joseph Sutton (22 November 1931 – 9 November 1985) was an Australian basketball player. He competed in the men's tournament at the 1956 Summer Olympics.

References

1931 births
1985 deaths
Australian men's basketball players
Olympic basketball players of Australia
Basketball players at the 1956 Summer Olympics
Place of birth missing